The Museum of Jade Art (MoJA) is an art museum about jade art in Zhongshan District, Taipei, Taiwan. It is the first museum in the world dedicated to jade art.

History
The museum founder, Soofeen Hu, visited the National Palace Museum during childhood. He was struck by a cabbage made of jade, thus he decided to open the Museum of Jade Art.

Exhibition
The exhibition includes the 13 jade tablets with Chinese calligraphy carved into them.

See also
 List of museums in Taiwan

References

2008 establishments in Taiwan
Art museums established in 2008
Art museums and galleries in Taiwan
Jade
Museums in Taipei